Thomas Frank Adams (born April 26, 1940) is a former American football player who played as a wide receiver. Born in Keewatin, Minnesota, he attended Keewatin High School and the University of Minnesota–Duluth. He played six times in the National Football League (NFL) for the Minnesota Vikings in 1962, starting once; he made three receptions for a total of 51 yards, with a long of 32 yards.

References

1940 births
Living people
People from Keewatin, Minnesota
Players of American football from Minnesota
American football wide receivers
Minnesota Duluth Bulldogs football players
Minnesota Vikings players